Mun Se-gwang (December 26, 1951  – December 20, 1974) was a Japanese-born North Korean sympathizer who attempted to assassinate South Korean president Park Chung-hee on August 15, 1974. The assassination attempt resulted in the deaths of Park's wife, Yuk Young-soo, and a high school student, Jang Bong-hwa.

Biography
Mun Se-gwang was born in Osaka on 26 December 1951, where many Zainichi Koreans resided. His family were immigrants from North Korea who fled to Japan shortly after the outbreak of the Korean War. While in high school, he began actively studying the biographies of Mao Zedong and Kim Il-sung, and became a supporter of far-left beliefs. For several years, he began communicating with supporters of Juche within the Korean community and fell under the influence of several North Korean agents, who eventually convinced him the need to eliminate President of the Republic of Korea Park Chung-hee in order to raise a 'popular uprising' in South Korea.

In November 1973, Mun Se-gwang finally decided to assassinate Park Chung-hee and, was paid 500,000 yen to prepare and implement his plan. In May 1974, he received a fake Japanese passport in the name of 'Yuki Kawagami'.

Attempted assassination of Park Chung-hee
Stealing a Smith & Wesson .38-caliber revolver from an Osaka police box on 18 July 1974, he concealed it in his luggage and flew to South Korea on 8 August 1974, using a Japanese passport to enter the country.  He then booked into the Chosun Hotel.  

Gaining entry to the National Theater in Seoul, on the day of a ceremony celebrating Korea's independence from Japan which was being attended by South Korean president Park Chung-hee and his wife, Mun intended to shoot Park in the theater lobby. However, his view was obstructed; and, he was forced to enter and be seated near the back of the theater.  During Park's address, he attempted to get closer to the President but inadvertently fired his revolver prematurely, injuring himself. Having alerted security, Mun then ran down the theater aisle firing wildly. His second bullet hit the left side of the podium from which Park was delivering his speech. His third bullet was a misfire but the fourth struck Park's wife, Yuk Young-soo, in the head, seriously wounding her. His last bullet went through a flag decorating the rear of the stage. A bullet fired by Park Jong-gyu, one of the President's security detail, in response to Mun's attack ricocheted off a wall and killed a high school student, Jang Bong-hwa. Immediately following the capture of Mun, Park resumed his scheduled speech, despite the wounding of his wife and her being carried from the stage. Following its completion, he picked up his wife's handbag and shoes and left. Despite extensive surgery, Yuk died at 7:00 p.m. that same day.

During his interrogation, Mun confessed to have been aided in his bid to assassinate President Park by an official of a North Korea aligned residents association in Japan.  This, and the fact that Mun used a Japanese passport to enter South Korea, strained diplomatic relationships between Japan, North Korea, and South Korea; South Korea concluded that Mun was acting on behalf of North Korea, but Japan refused to accept South Korea's position. Consequently, Park threatened to break off diplomatic relations and to nationalise Japanese assets in South Korea.  It required mediation by United States embassy officials before Japan issued a letter of regret, easing tensions between the two countries.

At the same time, North Korean officials made a statement that they were not involved in the assassination attempt on President Park, but they approved of it, calling Moon Se-gwang a "real communist."

Execution
At the trial, Mun Se-gwang also expressed regret that he had failed to kill President Park, and that an innocent schoolgirl had died because of his actions. On December 17, 1974, he was found guilty of the attempted assassination of President Park Chung-hee resulting in deaths of two people and sentenced to death. Four months after his failed attempt to assassinate President Park, Mun was executed by hanging in a Seoul prison.

See also
 History of South Korea
 Zainichi Korean
 Korean-Japanese disputes

Notes

Bibliography
 
 

1951 births
1974 deaths
Failed assassins
Far-left politics in South Korea
Far-left politics in Japan
People convicted of murder by South Korea
People executed by South Korea by hanging
South Korean activists
South Korean communists
South Korean expatriates in Japan
South Korean people convicted of murder
Zainichi Korean people
Executed South Korean people
Executed assassins
People executed for attempted murder
1974 murders in South Korea
People from Osaka